
Gmina Dębowiec is a rural gmina (administrative district) in Jasło County, Subcarpathian Voivodeship, in south-eastern Poland.

Villages
Gmina Dębowiec contains the villages and settlements of Cieklin, Dębowiec, Dobrynia, Duląbka, Dzielec, Folusz, Łazy Dębowieckie, Majscowa, Pagórek, Radość, Wola Cieklińska, Wola Dębowiecka and Zarzecze.

Neighbouring gminas
Gmina Dębowiec is bordered by the gminas of Jasło, Lipinki, Nowy Żmigród, Osiek Jasielski, Sękowa and Tarnowiec.

References
Polish official population figures 2006

Debowiec
Jasło County